is a 2022 video game compilation by Sega. It features remasters of the first four platform games in the Sonic the Hedgehog series originally released for the Sega Genesis and the Sega CD; Sonic the Hedgehog (1991), Sonic the Hedgehog 2 (1992), Sonic CD (1993), and Sonic the Hedgehog 3 & Knuckles (1994). The games are playable in their original format and a new widescreen format that removes lives. Origins adds additional game modes and missions, which allow players to unlock content in an in-game museum.

Origins was conceived following the release of the 2020 Sonic film; due to the influx of new fans, Sonic Team head Takashi Iizuka wanted to make the older Sonic games available on modern hardware. It was primarily developed at Sega, though Simon Thomley, who worked on Sonic Mania (2017), developed the remaster of Sonic 3 & Knuckles. A portion of the Sonic 3 soundtrack was replaced with rearrangements by Jun Senoue, following speculation of licensing problems arising from Michael Jackson's involvement with Sonic 3.

Origins was released for the Nintendo Switch, PlayStation 5, PlayStation 4, Windows, Xbox Series X/S and Xbox One on June 23, 2022, the series' 31st anniversary. It received mixed reviews from critics; they praised the enhancements and presentation, but criticized the downloadable content, replaced music in Sonic 3, lack of features, and additional bugs not present in the original games.

Content
Sonic Origins compiles and remasters the first four platform games in Sega's Sonic the Hedgehog series—Sonic the Hedgehog (1991), Sonic the Hedgehog 2 (1992), Sonic CD (1993), and Sonic the Hedgehog 3 & Knuckles (1994)—originally released for the Sega Genesis and the Sega CD. The player controls Sonic the Hedgehog, Miles "Tails" Prower, and Knuckles the Echidna as they attempt to stop Doctor Eggman from stealing the Chaos Emeralds. They traverse side-scrolling levels at high speeds while collecting rings, defeating enemies and bosses, and finding secrets. Unlike the originals, the player can control Tails and Knuckles in any game, with the exception of Knuckles in Sonic CD. The "Blue Spheres" minigame from Sonic 3 & Knuckles is also included, along with an all new version called New Blue Spheres, which added additional sphere types from Sonic Mania (2017).

Origins features two versions of each game: "classic mode" is the original format, presented in 4:3, while "anniversary mode" features support for widescreen displays, removes lives, and allows Sonic to use the "drop dash" from Sonic Mania. Both modes use the Retro Engine version of each game, aside of the emulation of the original game in classic mode. A "story mode" allows players to play through the four games sequentially in anniversary mode, with new animated cutscenes that bridge their stories, which are also seen when launching or clearing each game in either mode, respectively. New modes include a boss rush mode; a mirror mode that reverses the level layouts; and a mission mode featuring 60 additional standalone challenges, such as collecting a target number of rings within a time limit or reaching the goal without destroying any enemies.

An in-game museum allows players to view a collection of music, artwork, and videos, including the Sonic Mania Adventures animated shorts originally released in 2018. Players can unlock additional museum content, such as music arrangements from later games, concept art, and cutscene animatics, by completing in-game achievements or spending coins earned through gameplay. Coins can also be spent on additional attempts in Special Stages. Players who pre-ordered the game started with 100 coins and mirror mode unlocked. Menu aesthetics, a set of 11 harder missions, and tracks from Sonic Spinball (1993), Knuckles' Chaotix (1995) and Sonic 3D Blast (1996) for the museum music player are available as downloadable content (DLC).

Development
Sonic Origins was conceived alongside Sonic Colors: Ultimate (2021) following the release of the 2020 Sonic film. Because the film brought many new fans, Sonic Team head Takashi Iizuka wanted to make older Sonic games available on modern formats. Iizuka noted that though they are frequently rereleased via emulation, they felt "retro" on modern displays due to their 4:3 aspect ratios; he wanted Origins to modernize them with widescreen support and new features to appeal to both new and longtime fans. Sonic Mania encouraged Sonic Team that there was still an audience for 2D Sonic games and the series' 30th anniversary provided the "perfect" opportunity to develop a compilation.

The compilation was developed internally at Sega, which handled the presentation and consolidation of the included games. The remasters of Sonic the Hedgehog, Sonic 2, and Sonic CD are based on the remakes made in the Retro Engine released between 2011 and 2013; Christian Whitehead, creator of the Retro Engine, updated it to allow the remakes to run in a compilation. The Origins team prioritized the main Sonic series, so they did not consider including other 2D Sonic games, such as those released for the Game Gear, Knuckles' Chaotix, and the Sonic Advance series. Powerhouse Animation Studios produced the new cutscenes with longtime Sonic artist Tyson Hesse, with a script written by Sonic comic book writer Ian Flynn and featuring arranged music by Sonic Mania composer Tee Lopes.

Simon Thomley and his studio Headcannon, who worked on the Retro Engine remakes and Sonic Mania, developed the Origins remaster of Sonic 3 & Knuckles. Thomley said he was contracted to develop the remaster separately from Origins. The compilation marks Sonic 3 & Knuckles first rerelease since 2011, following speculation that soundtrack licensing problems arising from Michael Jackson's involvement with Sonic 3 were preventing new releases. As Sega was unable to use the soundtrack for Origins, Sonic Team composer Jun Senoue rearranged several tracks originally written for Sonic 3 prior to Jackson's involvement; they were previously featured in the 1997 Sonic & Knuckles Collection for Windows.

Thomley said he and the Headcannon team were unhappy with the version of Origins that Sega released, and that it did not represent Headcannon's work. He said they developed the Sonic 3 & Knuckles remaster under crunch conditions for a strict deadline, that Sega would not delay it, and that Sega had introduced bugs when integrating it in Origins. According to Thomley, the Headcannon team "were outsiders creating a separate project that was then wrangled into something entirely different".

Release
Sonic Origins was announced during a livestream commemorating the Sonic franchise's 30th anniversary on May 27, 2021, and was released on June 23, 2022—the series' 31st anniversary—for the Nintendo Switch, PlayStation 4, PlayStation 5, Windows, Xbox One, and Xbox Series X/S. Prior to release, Sega delisted the existing versions of the games from most digital stores. The move received criticism on video game preservation grounds and for preventing consumers from choosing their preferred versions. It was compared to Rockstar Games delisting Grand Theft Auto games before the release of the compilation Grand Theft Auto: The Trilogy – The Definitive Edition (2021), a decision that was reversed following backlash.

Reception

According to review aggregator Metacritic, Sonic Origins received "mixed or average" reviews for Nintendo Switch, PlayStation 4 and Windows; it received "generally favorable reviews" for the PlayStation 5 and Xbox Series X/S.

Zoey Handley of Destructoid felt that the compilation was lacking and lamented the lack of more substantial additions, writing: "The whole idea behind the new collection was apparently to 'modernize' the games; moving them into a new engine rather than simply emulating them. If that's the case, why stop with widescreen?" Brian Shea of Game Informer, by contrast, praised the enhancements made to the Anniversary mode, writing, "The Sonic Origins package is terrific overall... Having the best versions of the classic Sonic saga in one bundle is supremely satisfying." Heidi Kemps (GameSpot) and Stephen Tailby (Push Square) felt that while the additions made to the compilation justified the purchase for fans, its lackluster presentation and unnecessary downloadable content hindered Origins' overall quality.

Kemps noted that "even the recreations of the games themselves have some issues, with strange bugs that weren't present in the originals". John Linneman of Eurogamer also criticized the bugs, stating "most aren't game breaking, but the sheer number of them impact the overall experience", specifically mentioning a recurring bug in Sonic 2 that made Tails get stuck as the player progresses through the level. Jacob Bukacek of Hardcore Gamer felt that the new versions "aren't all that much better than the originals" and that the compilation "doesn't manage to justify the price tag". TJ Denzer of Shacknews was more forgiving, praising the added museum, Boss Rush mode, tight controls, and remaster quality, but disliked the lack of multiple saves and console commands.

Sam Machkovech of Ars Technica criticized the  downloadable content, lack of a rewind or save state option, and the delisting of the existing versions from most digital stores, calling it "a tragic example of good classics ruined by greed". Regarding the game's lack of bonus content, VentureBeat Mike Minotti wrote that "compared to, say, the 3D explorable world with its multiple media museums from Sonic Jam, it's a bit bare", but concluded that "a few oddities aside, these are fantastic remasters. Even if you're a Sonic fan who already owns these games in other compilations, Origins is worth it."

Sonic 3 replaced music received criticism. Destructoid said the replacement tracks "just feel wrong" and were inconsistent with the rest of the soundtrack, and Ars Technica said they did not compare well to the original tracks. Game Informer felt they stripped the levels of their nostalgic feel, but that replacing the music was better than omitting Sonic 3 entirely.

Notes

References

External links

 Official website

2022 video games
Nintendo Switch games
PlayStation 4 games
PlayStation 5 games
Sega video game compilations
Sonic the Hedgehog video games
Windows games
Xbox One games
Xbox Series X and Series S games